Eduardo Enrique Zambrano Martínez (born 21 January 1970) is an Ecuadorian former footballer who played as a midfielder for L.D.U. Quito. He made two appearances for the Ecuador national team in 1993. He was also part of Ecuador's squad for the 1993 Copa América tournament.

References

External links
 

1970 births
Living people
Ecuadorian footballers
Footballers from Quito
Association football midfielders
Ecuador international footballers
L.D.U. Quito footballers